The Wagner-Murray-Dingell Bill was a 1943 proposal to institute a national medical and hospitalization program. Senator Robert F. Wagner (D-New York), Senator James E. Murray (D-Montana), and Representative John D. Dingell, Sr. (D-Michigan) introduced it to the 79th United States Congress on November 19, 1943. The bill, part of President Truman 's Fair Deal program, was not passed. It is notable as an effort for health care reform in the United States.

History
A similar bill of the same name was introduced in 1943 but not enacted. The 1943 attempt was distinct.

Society and culture

Henry Kraus' book, In the City was a Garden, is about experiences of the resident's council of a World War II Garden Apartment (FHA) housing project for the war effort in San Pedro Ca. Chapter VI - Kaleidoscope of Change, gives an extended account of attempts to provide medical clinics in the projects and the California Medical Association response against what it called "government medicine." From a historical perspective, it is an interesting read on that subject and others of the time period.

References

External links
an account from the US government Social Security website

Healthcare reform in the United States